Arnout or Arnoud is a Dutch language masculine given name equivalent to Arnold.  Notable persons with that name include:

Persons with the given name
 Arnout II, Count of Aarschot, 12th-century count of Aarschot, Flanders
 Arnout III, Count of Aarschot, 12th-century count of Aarschot, Flanders
 Arnout IV, 12th-century count of Aarschot, Flanders
 Arnoud van der Biesen (1899–1968), Dutch sailor
 Arnoud Boot (born 1960), Dutch economist
 Arnout Coninx (1548–1617), Flemish printer and bookseller
 Arnoud De Meyer, Belgian management academic
 Arnoud van Doorn (born 1966), Dutch politician
 Arnout Elsevier (1579–1656), Dutch painter
 Arnout van Eyndhouts or Arnoud de Lens ( 1510–1582), Dutch humanist philosopher and poet
 Arnoud van Groen (born 1983), Dutch cyclist
 Arnoud van Halen (1673–1732), Dutch painter 
 Arnoud Hendriks (born 1949), Dutch figure skater
 Arnout de Muyser ( 1575-1599), Flemish painter
 Arnoud Okken (born 1982), Dutch athlete 
 Arnoud de Pret Roose de Calesberg, Belgian businessman
 Arnout Schuijff (born  1967), Dutch entrepreneur

Persons with the surname
 Fernand Arnout (1899–1974), French weightlifter
 Peter Joseph Arnoudt (1811–1865), Belgian Jesuit writer

See also
 Arnold (given name)
 Arnoldus

Dutch masculine given names